Ertl (formerly, the Ertl Company) is an American former manufacturing company and current brand of toys, best known for its die-cast metal alloy collectible replicas (or scale models) of agricultural machinery. Other products manufactured by Ertl include cars, airplanes, and commercial vehicles.

The company was based in Dyersville, Iowa, home of the National Farm Toy Museum.

History 
Ertl has been producing farm toy replicas since 1945. For over 60 years, the company has produced farm toys for industry brands such as: John Deere, Case IH, New Holland, and AGCO. Ertl has also, on different occasions, acquired the licenses to produce die-cast vehicles and figurines as well as model kits for Looney Tunes, Garfield, Thomas the Tank Engine, Tugs (TV series), Theodore Tugboat, Super Mario Bros. DC Comics, and Star Wars.  In 1999, Ertl was purchased by Racing Champions. Ertl is currently a brand under the RC2 Corporation umbrella.

Timeline 
Important Dates in Racing Champions/Ertl Company History

1945 -	The Ertl Company is founded by Fred Ertl Sr., in Dubuque, Iowa
1959 -	The company moves to larger facilities in Dyersville, Iowa
1967 -	Ertl is acquired by Victor Comptometer Corporation
1971 - Ertl acquires Carter Tru-Scale
1973 - Ertl begins manufacturing plastic model kits
1974 - Ertl acquires Structo Stamped Steel
1977 -	Kidde, Inc. acquires Ertl with purchase of Victor Comptometer Corp
1981 - Ertl acquires AMT model kit company
1985 -	Ertl acquires MPC model kits
1986 - Ertl produces Thomas & Friends licensed toys
1987 -	Hanson plc purchases Kidde. Ertl acquires ESCI model kit company
1989 -	Racing Champions is founded by Bob Dods, Boyd Meyer and Peter Chung
1990 -	Ertl releases the first Precision Series farm toy replica
1991–92 - Racing Champions obtains NASCAR license
1992 -	Fred Ertl Jr. & Robert J. Ertl retire
1995 -	Hanson plc consolidates its U.S. companies to form U.S.I. (United States Industries)
1993 - Ertl begins the Wings Of Texaco die cast airplane collection
1996 -	Racing Champions introduces its Mint line of non-racing vehicles. Racing Champions Corporation is formed
1997 -	Racing Champions completes its initial public stock offering (RACN on NASDAQ)
1999 - Company produces a commercial version of the Eternity puzzle
1999 -	Racing Champions acquires The Ertl Company
2000 - Ertl acquires Britains Limited
2003 - Racing Champions Ertl acquired Chicago-based Learning Curve International, Inc.
2004 - RC2 Corporation acquired Playing Mantis assets and The First Years Inc., while the Thomas & Friends range was discontinued.
2008 - Round 2 LLC signs licensing agreement to produce and market AMT, MPC, Polar Lights, and 1:24 and 1:18 scale diecast 
2009 - Ertl celebrates 50 years in Dyersville, Iowa
2010 - Ertl celebrates its 65th Anniversary
2011 - Tomy acquired RC2; maintains control of Ertl, Racing Champions and Johnny Lightning tooling
2012 - Round 2 LLC acquires full rights to AMT, MPC, Polar Lights tooling
2013 - Tomy discontinues Johnny Lightning brand
2015 – Round 2 LLC obtains the rights to use Racing Champions, American Muscle and ERTL Custom and Premium tooling
2016 – Round 2 LLC obtains the rights to use Johnny Lighting tooling
2018 – Ertl sells Die-cast Promotions (DCP) company to First Gear Inc.
2020 - Tomy reintroduces Johnny Lightning brand

Products

Plastic model kits
In the late 1970s, Ertl offered a series of plastic model kits of heavy commercial trucks, over-the-road trailers, tractors, plows, and farm wagons. Although these kits never achieved the hoped-for popularity, they led to the acquisition of AMT. In 1983, AMT was purchased by Ertl from Lesney, and renamed AMT/Ertl. AMT/Ertl then had a 24-year relationship until AMT was sold in 2007.

Movies and TV franchises

In the 1980s, Ertl got licenses to produce and commercialise model cars from movies and TV series, such as KITT from the Knight Rider and the Batvehicles from the 1989 Batman film.

American muscle diecast
In the early 1990s Ertl started the American Muscle line up of diecast collectible cars and trucks.  These were 1:18 scale replicas that quickly found a dedicated following of baby boomers.  Limited editions of 2,500 were especially sought after.  Many of the earliest releases have fetched upwards of $500. The most popular and desirable is the 1957 Chevy Bel Air known as Peggy Sue.

Airplanes 
Ertl has also produced a number of die cast airplane models over the years, including some promotional items for Texaco, Continental Airlines and others.

See also

 Bumble Ball
 Thomas & Friends merchandise#Ertl Company

References

External links

 

 
Toy cars and trucks
Die-cast toys
Companies based in Iowa
Toy brands
Toy companies established in 1945
Dyersville, Iowa
American companies established in 1945
1945 establishments in Iowa